Hate is a 1920 German silent drama film directed by Manfred Noa and starring Tzwetta Tzatschewa, Ernst Deutsch and Rudolf Lettinger.

The film's sets were designed by the art director Karl Machus.

Cast
 Tzwetta Tzatschewa
 Ernst Deutsch
 Rudolf Lettinger
 Loo Hardy
 Sent Mahesa
 Henri Peters-Arnolds

References

Bibliography
 Bock, Hans-Michael & Bergfelder, Tim. The Concise CineGraph. Encyclopedia of German Cinema. Berghahn Books, 2009.

External links

1920 films
Films of the Weimar Republic
German silent feature films
Films directed by Manfred Noa
German black-and-white films
1920s German films